The Rutan VariViggen is a homebuilt aircraft designed by Burt Rutan.  The aircraft is a tandem two-seater of primarily wooden construction with a delta wing and a canard foreplane. The VariViggen is powered by a 150 hp Lycoming O-320 aero engine in pusher configuration. The prototype was designated Model 27, and the production version was Model 32.

Design and development

The VariViggen was named after the Swedish fighter plane, the Saab 37 Viggen. This and the XB-70 Valkyrie inspired the design. Rutan became interested in aircraft which resisted stalls and spins, and the VariViggen was his first full scale design. He began working with the design as a student at Cal Poly in the early 1960s, and started building the prototype in his garage in 1968. After four years of work, the aircraft made its first flight in April, 1972.  In order to increase efficiency, the Model 32 (also known as the VariViggen SP) had a slightly longer fuselage, a larger wingspan and winglets.

The Rutan Aircraft Factory sold 600 plan sets for the VariViggen to homebuilders, and eventually about 20 of the aircraft were built. Following the crash of one in New Brunswick, Canada in September 2006 due to wing tank fuel contamination, fewer than five are currently still flying. The prototype aircraft, N27VV, can be seen in the 1975 movie Death Race 2000 and was eventually donated to the EAA AirVenture Museum in 1988.

Rutan also began work on an all-aluminum variant, the MiniViggen, but later abandoned the project and focused his efforts on the VariEze.

VariViggen Model 27 Specifications (Standard Wing)

References

External links

 NZ website on the VariViggen
 Sun 'n Fun Air Museum 
 AirVenture Museum
 Museum of Flight VariViggen website
 Aerofiles VariViggen information
 VariViggen History (Link Fixed 031921)

Aircraft first flown in 1972
Homebuilt aircraft
VariViggen
Canard aircraft
Delta-wing aircraft
Single-engined pusher aircraft
Low-wing aircraft